Michael Worsnip is a South African Anglican theologian. He is author of several books, most notably Between the Two Fires - the Anglican Church in South Africa 1948 -1957; the book Priest and Partisan: A South African journey on anti-Apartheid activist and fellow Anglican priest, Father Michael Lapsley; the Novel Remittance Man. He was formerly the Secretary General of the Lesotho Council of churches and was deported from South Africa after giving an interview to the BBC.

He is currently Managing Director of Maropeng, the official visitor center to the Cradle of Humankind World Heritage Site and was Land Claims Commissioner for the Western Cape, he has previously been involved in Land and Housing in South Africa.

Publications 

Worsnip's publications include:

 
 
 
  with Desmond van der Water.

References 

South African theologians
South African non-fiction writers
21st-century South African Anglican priests
Living people
Year of birth missing (living people)